Eneko Llanos Burguera (born 30 November 1976 in Vitoria-Gasteiz, Alava) is a Spanish triathlete.

Llanos competed at the first Olympic triathlon at the 2000 Summer Olympics. He took twenty-third place with a total time of 1:50:48.35. Four years later, at the 2004 Summer Olympics, Llanos competed again, moving up in the ranking to twentieth place. His time on the more difficult Athens course was 1:54:52.37.

He has also been a top-10 finisher at Hawaii Ironman on three occasions.
In 2008 Eneko became a recognized competitor for the Ironman Hawaii crown. After a fierce duel with Chris Mccormack in Wildflower, where he finished 19 seconds behind Mccormack, and when the scenario repeated itself in Frankfurt, it was clear that Eneko was a serious contender. He was then mentioned on many occasions as one of the pre-favourites, with Mccormack, Craig Alexander and Normann Stadler.

Again it was a 2nd place, and again it was to a time difference of 3 minutes and 5 seconds. 

He is vegetarian.

He was champion of the first Abu Dhabi International Triathlon.

References 

Ironman Arizona 1st place 11/18/2018

1976 births
Living people
Spanish male triathletes
Triathletes from the Basque Country (autonomous community)
Triathletes at the 2000 Summer Olympics
Triathletes at the 2004 Summer Olympics
Olympic triathletes of Spain
Sportspeople from Vitoria-Gasteiz